The 2013 Atlantic 10 men's basketball tournament was played on March 14–17 at the Barclays Center in Brooklyn. The top 12 teams in the final standings qualified for the tournament, The 2013 championship game was nationally televised on CBS. As the tournament champion, Saint Louis received the Atlantic 10 Conference's automatic bid to the 2013 NCAA tournament.

Seeds
The top twelve teams qualified for the tournament. Teams were seeded by record within the conference, with a tiebreaker system to seed teams with identical conference records.

Eliminated from Conference tournament: St. Bonaventure (7–9), Rhode Island (3–13), Fordham (3–13), Duquesne (1–15)

Bracket

All times listed are Eastern

References

External links
 2013 A-10 Men's Basketball Championship Central 

Atlantic 10 men's basketball tournament
2012–13 Atlantic 10 Conference men's basketball season
Basketball in New York City
College sports in New York City
Sports in Brooklyn
Sports competitions in New York City
Atlantic 10 men's basketball tournament
Atlantic 10 men's basketball tournament
2010s in Brooklyn
Prospect Heights, Brooklyn